Barraux is a commune in the Isère department in southeastern France. It includes the hamlets of Le Fayet, La Gache, and the 15th century fort, Fort Barraux.

Location
Barraux has the village of Chapareillan to the north; La Buissiere, Le Boissieu and La Flachere to the south; Pontcharra to the east and Sainte-Marie-du-Mont, on the Plateau des Petites Roches to the west. It is situated in the valley of the Gresivaudan through which the Isère river flows.

Population

The inhabitants of Barraux are called Barrolins.

History (the village)
The village of Barraux was probably founded as part of the supply chain to feed the fort Barraux built by Charles Emmanuel II to act as a border fort. In 1985 the fort was given back to the village of Barraux, from the French army.

History (the fort)

Fort Saint Barthélémy
Fort Saint Barthélémy (eventually Fort Barraux) is the oldest fort using bastions in France. It was built in 1597 and its aspect changed very little over the past 400 years as the general layout invented by the Piedmontese architect Ercole Negro will be left almost intact by its followers: A fortress with an extended star shape with a narrow end, including many bastions and advanced ditches.

The fort was taken by surprise right after its completion by Lesdiguières, the Constable of Dauphiné. A few enhancements have been undertaken by the engineers of King Henry IV but didn't affect the general layout.

Vauban himself, Fortress Inspector in Chief of King Louis XIV in the late 17th century didn't change the arrangement of bastions and curtains. He would rather improve the various buildings inside the fort: two barracks, the well, the chapel, the large powder magazine and the gate house.

In the early 19th century, a casemate was added southward as this section was considered to be the weakest point

17th century
Original held at Bibliothèque Municipale of Grenoble. Talented engineers will improve the fort, but keep the general layout designed by Ercole Negro
Jean de Beins enlarges the fort eastward and builds the Governor Hotel.
Camus builds forward bastions southward
Delangrunne levels the West curtain and extracts the central bastion to form the entrance ravelin (or demi-lune).
Entrance of the fort is moved several times during that century. Initially located on the North front (with an access through the Savoie ravelin), it ends up facing West, where it is still today.

Vauban and the Fort

When Vauban arrived at the fort in 1692 he is extremely negative about what was achieved by its predecessors. He asks for the improvement of the most obvious weaknesses:

Ditches are made 2-meter deeper (6 feet)
Design of bastions is modified with their edges sharpened
Width of covered ways is reduced, their layout is streamlined and profile remodeled. Traverses are cut into them to confine the effect of ricochet  fire
Galleries are added inside the flanks of bastions
Watchtowers are remodeled
Communication between the central fort and the ravelin of Savoie is modified with the addition of an open caponniere including parapets and palisades
Curtains of the North and East fronts are enhanced with the addition of light tenailles and palisades
Vauban finally creates the South redoubt

18th to 20th centuries
The gate house and the magazine were completed in the early 18th century. Two additional barracks were built.
The modern chapel was built in 1724 thanks to a gift from King Louis the Fifteenth on the ruins of the initial chapel from the Renaissance.
Large scale construction resumes circa 1820 with the addition of a casemate on the south front to reinforce its defense.
A cylindrical obstacle called "demoiselle" (Miss), was erected on the top of a traverse that crosses the ditch. Besiegers that would cross this traverse would have to kiss the Miss to bypass it, hence the name.
In the 1870s, unrest with Italy lead to the construction of 6 forts around Grenoble. During the 19th century, defenses of Fort Barraux were also enhanced.
The fort was used as a prison during both world wars; then in 1947, it was turned into an ammunition depot. The fort was left by the military in 1985 and was acquired by the municipality of Barraux.

Twin towns
Barraux is twinned with:

  Lanhouarneau, France

See also
Charles Emmanuel II
Isère
Grenoble
Dauphiné
Dukes of Savoy

References

External links

L'Atelier des Dauphins (Workshop of the Dauphins)
Isère Tourism Board
Official site of the departement of Isère(In French)
Grenoble Tourism Board(English Version Available)

Communes of Isère
Vauban fortifications in France